Katharine Julia Scott Bishop (June 23, 1889 – September 20, 1975) was a trained anatomist, medical physician, researcher and educator best known for co-discovering Vitamin E.

Early life 
In 1889, Bishop was born in New York as Katharine Scott, to Walter and Katherine Emma (Campbell) Scott. She attended the Somerville High School (Massachusetts) for high school and later received her undergraduate degree from Wellesley College in 1910. After taking premedical courses at Radcliffe College, Bishop went on to graduate from The Johns Hopkins University School of Medicine and earned her medical degree in 1915.

Discovery of Vitamin E 
After graduating from medical school, Bishop moved to Berkeley to teach histology in the anatomy department at the University of California Medical School until 1923. During this time, Bishop did her medical research with anatomist and endocrinologist Herbert McLean Evans. Together, they published a monograph on the vital staining of connective tissue cells. The discovery of Vitamin E came as a result of the study of the reproductive cycle of rats. After establishing a standard diet for the rats to maintain their regular reproductive cycle, Bishop and Evans started experimenting with dietary deficiencies. In 1923, they found a previously unknown factor that is vital for reproduction. When the rats were fed with a diet where lard was the only source of fat, though grew healthily, the female rats were unable to carry babies full term due to the breakdown of the placentas, and the male rats became sterile since the sperm-forming cells in the testes would deteriorate. Initially called "Factor X", Bishop and Evans narrowed down that this factor came from the lipid extract of lettuce and wheat germ. The name "Vitamin E" later came after Vitamin D.

Later life 
From 1924 to 1929, Bishop worked as a histopathologist at the George Williams Hooper Foundation for Medical Research in San Francisco. After her marriage and birth of her two daughters, she spent two years studying public health at the University of California Medical School. In mid-1930s, Bishop became a practicing physician and anesthesiologist at St. Luke's Hospital in San Francisco. She accepted a position at Alta Bates Hospital in Berkeley, California in 1940, and worked there until her retirement in 1953. She died at home in Berkeley in 1975.

Publications 
 with Evans, Herbert Mclean On the existence of a hitherto unknown dietary factor essential for reproduction, Science n.s. 56:650-51
 with Evans, Herbert Mclean On the relations between fertility and nutrition IV. The production of sterility with nutritional regimes adequate for growth and its cure with other foodstuffs. Journal of Metabolic Research, 3:233-316
 with Evans, Herbert Mclean Existence of a hitherto unknown dietary factor essential for reproduction, J. Am. Med. Assoc., 81: 899-92
 with Evans, Herbert Mclean On an invariable and characteristic disturbance of reproductive function in animals reared on a diet poor in fat and soluble vitamin A, Anat. Record, 23:18-19
 with Evans, Herbert Mclean On the differential reactions to vital dyes exhibited by the two great groups of connective-tissue cells. Carnegie. Inst. Wash. Contrib. Embryology. 10(47):1-5

See also 
 Herbert McLean Evans
 Physicians
 University of California San Francisco

References

External links 
 National Academy of Sciences Biography of Herbert McLean Evans
 Vitamin E Discovery

University of California, San Francisco faculty
Vitamin E
Wellesley College alumni
Johns Hopkins School of Medicine alumni
1889 births
1975 deaths
20th-century American women scientists
Vitamin researchers
Women anatomists
Women medical researchers